is a railway station located in Yahatanishi-ku, Kitakyūshū.

Lines 

Chikuhō Electric Railroad
Chikuhō Electric Railroad Line

Platforms

Adjacent stations

Surrounding area
 Senpukuji Temple
 Kusubashi Kindergarten
 Kusubashi Park
 Sasao Park
 Kusubashi Nursery
 Fukuoka Prefectural Route 280

Railway stations in Fukuoka Prefecture
Railway stations in Japan opened in 1958